Philip Archibald Gibbs (August 5, 1893 – March 4, 1960) was a Canadian politician. He served in the Legislative Assembly of British Columbia from 1952 to 1960  from the electoral district of Oak Bay, a member of the Liberal Party. He died in office on March 4, 1960, from cancer.

References

British Columbia Liberal Party MLAs
British emigrants to Canada
Canadian accountants
People from Llwynypia
Deaths from cancer in British Columbia
1893 births
1960 deaths